Manon Bollegraf and Martina Navratilova were the defending champions, but Navratilova did not compete this year, following her plans of retiring from professional tennis at the end of the season.

Bollegraf teamed up with Nicole Arendt and successfully defended her title, by defeating Chanda Rubin and Caroline Vis 6–4, 6–7(4–7), 6–4 in the final.

Seeds

Draw

Draw

References

External links
 Official results archive (ITF)
 Official results archive (WTA)

1995 Doubles
European Indoors - Doubles